Vice-Admiral Sir Peter William Beckwith Ashmore  (4 February 1921 – 31 July 2002) was a Royal Navy officer. After retirement from the navy he became Master of the Household to the Sovereign.

Early life
Ashmore was the son of Vice-Admiral Leslie Ashmore: he was educated at Yardley Court and the Royal Naval College, Dartmouth; he joined the Royal Navy in 1938.

Naval career
On graduation from Dartmouth, Ashmore served in the Second World War in the destroyer HMS Kipling in which he commanded the ship's guns during an operation to rescue survivors from two other British ships off Crete in May 1941. After the War he became Deputy Director of the Royal Navy Staff College at Greenwich in 1957, Captain (Frigates) of the Dartmouth Training Squadron in 1960 and a member of the Plans Division at the Admiralty in 1963. He went on to be Flag Officer, Admiralty Interview Board in 1966, Chief of Staff of the Western Fleet and to NATO Commander-in-Chief Eastern Atlantic in 1967 and Chief of the Allied Staff at Headquarters Allied Naval Forces Southern Europe in 1970 before he retired in 1972.

In retirement Ashmore was Master of the Household to the Sovereign. His elder brother was Admiral Sir Edward Ashmore who became Admiral of the Fleet and Chief of the Defence Staff.

References

Royal Navy vice admirals
1921 births
2002 deaths
Masters of the Household
Knights Commander of the Order of the Bath
Knights Commander of the Royal Victorian Order
Recipients of the Distinguished Service Cross (United Kingdom)